Susantha Dissanayake (born 7 June 1974) is a Sri Lankan cricketer. He played twelve first-class and eight List A matches between 1994 and 2000. He his now an umpire and stood in matches in the 2016–17 Premier League Tournament and the 2016–17 Districts One Day Tournament.

References

External links
 

1974 births
Living people
Sri Lankan cricketers
Sri Lankan cricket umpires
Moors Sports Club cricketers
Moratuwa Sports Club cricketers
Sri Lanka Police Sports Club cricketers
Sportspeople from Kandy